Agnes Schierhuber (born 31 May 1946) is an Austrian politician and Member of the European Parliament (MEP). She is a member of the Austrian People's Party, which is part of the European People's Party.

Schierhuber has been a member of the European Parliament since 1995 and currently sits as a full member of the Agriculture and Rural Development Committee.  She is also part of the Delegation for relations with Canada.  As a substitute member she sits on the Employment and Social Affairs Committee. She is the vice-chairwoman of the EPP-ED Group working party on agricultural and budgetary issues.

Career
 Completed agricultural school (1964)
 Passed specialist examination (1975)
 Member, ÖVP Local and District Executive (since 1975)
 Member, Executive Committee, Lower Austria Farmers' Federation (since 1985)
 Vice-chair, Ottenschlag Farmers' Chamber (1975-1995)
 Ottenschlag Women Farmers' Representative (1974-1994)
 Vice-chair, Ottenschlag Raiffeisenkassen supervisory board (since 1980)
 Member, Regional Executive, Farmers' Social Insurance Institute (SVB) (1983-1998)
 Member, Lower Austria Regional Chamber of Agriculture (1985-1986)
 Member, Bundesrat (1986-1996)
 Member of the European Parliament (since 1995)
 Appointed Ökonomierat (2000)
 Vice-chair, EPP-ED Group working party on agricultural and budgetary issues (since 2003)
 Chair, Austrian Association for Medicinal and Herbal Horticulture (since 1993)
 Chair, Waldviertel Specialist Growers' Association (since 2003)

Honours 
 1995: Decoration for Services to the Republic of Austria in Silver
 1996: Silver Medal of the Chamber of Agriculture of Lower Austria
 1996: Leopold Figl Silver Medal 
 2005: Grand Decoration of Honour in Gold for Services to the Republic of Austria  
 2006: Gold Medal of the Chamber of Agriculture of Lower Austria
 2006: Gold Decoration of the Farmers Association from Lower Austria

References

External links
 Official website (in German)
 European Parliament
 European Parliament biography
 European People's Party

1946 births
Living people
Austrian People's Party MEPs
MEPs for Austria 1996–1999
MEPs for Austria 1999–2004
MEPs for Austria 2004–2009

Recipients of the Grand Decoration for Services to the Republic of Austria
20th-century women MEPs for Austria
21st-century women MEPs for Austria